Augland is a neighbourhood in the city of Kristiansand in Agder county, Norway.  The neighborhood is located in the borough of Vågsbygd and in the district of Vågsbygd.  Augland is north of Auglandsbukta, south of Auglandslia, east of Auglandskollen, and west of Skyllingsheia.  Vågsbygd Church is located in the neighborhood.

Transport

References

Geography of Kristiansand
Neighbourhoods of Kristiansand